2011 FC Gifu season.

J2 League

References

External links
 J.League official site

FC Gifu
FC Gifu seasons